The Forum for Democracy, Development and Morality (FDDM) was a political party in Benin.

History
The party contested the 1995 parliamentary elections as part of the "New Generation" alliance with the National Union for Solidarity and Progress. The two parties received 2.4% of the vote, winning two seats. The seats were taken by Souléman Zoumarou and Mamoudou Zoumarou.

In the 1999 elections it was part of the Suru Alliance, which won one seat.

References

Defunct political parties in Benin